James Matthew Kitts (born December 28, 1972 in Portsmouth, Virginia) is a former American football running back in the National Football League for the Green Bay Packers, the Washington Redskins, and the Miami Dolphins.  He played college football at Ferrum College.

References

1972 births
Living people
American football running backs
Ferrum Panthers football players
Green Bay Packers players
Miami Dolphins players
Washington Redskins players
Memphis Maniax players